Albert Jeunepierre Fields (born March 3, 1975) is an American actor and pop singer.  He was a Mousketeer on The All New Mickey Mouse Club and a member of the pop group The Party. After The Party disbanded, Albert went under the moniker Jeune (which is half of his middle name) and released a solo album in 1995 titled Back to Reality.  The song "I'm da Man" was featured in the Wesley Snipes/Robert De Niro film The Fan. Jeune continues to record and perform on the indie circuit. Albert had recently reunited with his old friend, former Mouseketeer/Party bandmate Damon Pampolina to form their own group, N'Decent Proposal.

External links 
 
 Indiana Jeune on Myspace

American male television actors
American male singers
Mouseketeers
Living people
1975 births
21st-century American singers